Diego Sebastián Saja (born 5 June 1979) is an Argentine football coach and former player who is currently an assistant coach for Major League Soccer side Inter Miami CF.

He spent most of his professional career with San Lorenzo, Racing Club and AEK Athens, being one of the most prolific goalscoring goalkeepers in history. He represented four clubs in the Spanish Segunda División, and also competed in Italy, Mexico and Brazil.

Club career

San Lorenzo
Born in La Plata, Buenos Aires Province, Saja had nearly 200 overall appearances for San Lorenzo de Almagro, being voted South America's best goalkeeper in 2002. In 2001, he helped the team win the Clausura and the Copa Mercosur, adding the following year's Copa Sudamericana.

Saja split the 2003–04 season with Brescia Calcio and Rayo Vallecano, being first-choice and dropping down a level with the latter. Moving to another club in Spain and in the second division for the following campaign, he would also be relegated with Córdoba CF.

After a brief spell in Mexico with Club América, Saja returned to San Lorenzo for 2005–06: he made 33 appearances and scored five goals in the Primera División, but was eventually sent out on loan for the fifth time, this time to Grêmio Foot-Ball Porto Alegrense after falling out of favour with new manager Ramón Díaz.

AEK
Released in 2008, Saja signed a three-year contract with AEK Athens, earning approximately €400.000. He appeared in 29 games in his first year to help his team finish fourth in the league, but they was also quickly eliminated from UEFA Cup contention.

On 31 May 2009, Saja agreed to a new three-year deal with the Greek side, continuing to be first-choice and winning the Greek Cup in 2011.

Return to Argentina
On 29 June 2011, Saja and AEK agreed to terminate his contract one year before it expired. Shortly after, the 32-year-old returned to his homeland and joined Racing Club de Avellaneda, netting his first goal for his new team on 29 September of the following year, through a penalty against former club San Lorenzo in a 4–0 win; he was also the goalkeeper with the fewest goals conceded in the 2011 Apertura, breaking a club record for a short tournament held by Carlos Roa since 1992.

On 9 June 2013, again from the penalty spot, Saja scored against Boca Juniors (2–0 home triumph, which qualified for the Copa Sudamericana). On 18 October 2015, against the same opponent but for the league, he repeated the feat to help the hosts win it 3–1.

Gimnàstic / Zaragoza
On 16 August 2016, free agent Saja signed a one-year deal with Gimnàstic de Tarragona, returning to Spain and its second tier after 11 years. Due to the injury of Manolo Reina, he was made a starter during the first matches of the season.

On 21 December 2016, after being overtaken by another new signing, Stole Dimitrievski, Saja left Nàstic by mutual consent. The following 24 January, he joined fellow league team Real Zaragoza until the end of the campaign.

On 9 June 2017, Saja announced his retirement at the age of 38.

International career
Saja earned four caps for Argentina, making his debut against Wales on 13 February 2002 (1–1 in Cardiff). In the following year he appeared in a further three friendlies, with Honduras (3–1), Mexico (1–0) and the United States (1–0).

Honours

Club
San Lorenzo
Argentine Primera División: 2001 Clausura
Copa Mercosur: 2001
Copa Sudamericana: 2002

Grêmio
Campeonato Gaúcho: 2007

AEK
Greek Football Cup: 2010–11

Racing Club
Argentine Primera División: 2014

Individual
Toulon Tournament Best Goalkeeper: 1999
South American Goalkeeper of the Year: 2002
Copa Libertadores: Best goalkeeper 2007

References

External links
  
 
 
 
 
  

1979 births
Living people
Argentine people of Italian descent
Italian people of Argentine descent
Naturalised citizens of Italy
Footballers from La Plata
Argentine footballers
Association football goalkeepers
Argentine Primera División players
San Lorenzo de Almagro footballers
Racing Club de Avellaneda footballers
Serie A players
Brescia Calcio players
Segunda División players
Rayo Vallecano players
Córdoba CF players
Gimnàstic de Tarragona footballers
Real Zaragoza players
Liga MX players
Club América footballers
Campeonato Brasileiro Série A players
Grêmio Foot-Ball Porto Alegrense players
Super League Greece players
AEK Athens F.C. players
Club Agropecuario Argentino managers
Argentina under-20 international footballers
Argentina international footballers
Argentine expatriate footballers
Expatriate footballers in Italy
Expatriate footballers in Spain
Expatriate footballers in Mexico
Expatriate footballers in Brazil
Expatriate footballers in Greece
Argentine expatriate sportspeople in Italy
Argentine expatriate sportspeople in Spain
Argentine expatriate sportspeople in Mexico
Argentine expatriate sportspeople in Brazil
Argentine expatriate sportspeople in Greece
Argentine football managers
Argentine expatriate football managers
Expatriate football managers in Paraguay
Inter Miami CF non-playing staff
Association football goalkeeping coaches